Petr Sodomka (born 19 May 1947 in Pardubice) is a former Czechoslovak slalom canoeist who competed in the 1960s and the 1970s. He won nine medals at the ICF Canoe Slalom World Championships with five golds (C-1: 1975, 1977; C-1 team: 1967, 1973, 1975), a silver (C-1 team: 1969) and three bronzes (C-1: 1971; C-1 team: 1971, 1977).

Sodomka also finished eighth in the C-1 event at the 1972 Summer Olympics in Munich.

References

External links
 

1947 births
Canoeists at the 1972 Summer Olympics
Czechoslovak male canoeists
Living people
Olympic canoeists of Czechoslovakia
Medalists at the ICF Canoe Slalom World Championships
Sportspeople from Pardubice